The English cricket team toured Australia in October 2022 to play three Twenty20 International (T20I) matches as a preparatory series before the 2022 ICC Men's T20 World Cup and toured  again in November 2022 to play three One Day International (ODI) matches. In May 2022, Cricket Australia (CA) confirmed the fixtures for the tour.

England won the first T20I in Perth by 8 runs, Alex Hales top scoring with 84 runs from 51 balls after David Warner had scored 73 from 44 for the hosts. A talking point from the match came in the 17th over of Australia's innings when Matthew Wade appeared to block England bowler Mark Wood from fielding the ball after it had looped up off the top edge of Wade's bat. England captain Jos Buttler opted not to appeal for a dismissal under Law 37 "obstructing the field", citing a long tour and preferring not to risk such an appeal on this occasion. England sealed the series with another 8-run victory in the second T20I, with Dawid Malan's 82 runs from 49 balls helping them recover from a poor start in Canberra. The final T20I was eventually abandoned due to rain after England's innings had been reduced to 12 overs and Australia lost three early wickets in their run chase.

Squads

England also named Tymal Mills, Richard Gleeson and Liam Dawson as travelling reserves for the T20I series and the T20 World Cup. On the same day as the squad announcement, Jonny Bairstow was ruled out of the tournament after sustaining a possible broken leg while playing golf.  On 7 September, Alex Hales was named as Bairstow's replacement in the squad. On 6 October, CA announced the squad for the T20I series with their plan of pre-World Cup squad shuffle between the first and last two T20Is. Glenn Maxwell was ruled out of Australia's ODI squad before the start of the ODI series after suffering a broken leg, with Sean Abbott named as his replacement. Josh Inglis was added to Australia's ODI squad before the second ODI in place of Cameron Green, after which Mitchell Starc was rested for the third ODI and Riley Meredith was added to the squad as a replacement.

T20I series

1st T20I

2nd T20I

3rd T20I

ODI series

1st ODI

2nd ODI

3rd ODI

Notes

References

External links
 Series home at ESPNcricinfo

2022 in Australian cricket
2022 in English cricket
International cricket competitions in 2022–23
2022-23